The Eileen M. Collins Observatory is a small astronomical observatory operated by Corning Community College in Corning, New York, United States.  It is named for astronaut Eileen Collins.  The observatory is primarily used to teach astronomy classes, but the college also provides monthly viewing sessions for the public.

The observatory is equipped with reflecting telescopes ranging from four inches to 20 inches in diameter.  The largest telescope is a one-tenth scale model of the Hale telescope at Mount Palomar.  The smaller telescopes were assembled by the Elmira-Corning Astronomical Society.  Additionally, the observatory maintains an eight-inch Schmidt–Cassegrain telescope and a solar telescope.

See also
List of astronomical observatories

References

External links
Official website

Astronomical observatories in New York (state)
SUNY community colleges
Buildings and structures in Steuben County, New York